Ringo is a short film directed by Conall Jones and Alf Seccombe. The cast includes Alf Seccombe and a pony named buttercup.

Festivals 
Ringo was in competition at the International Film Festival Rotterdam, and won the Audience Award at the 2005 Cal State Media Arts Festival "Past Winners". The film also played at Cinematexas 10, 2005 Santa Cruz International Film Festival, and the 21st Film Arts Festival.

References

External links 

 "YouTube"

2005 short films
2005 films
2005 comedy films
American comedy short films
2000s English-language films
2000s American films